Kepanjen is a district and the capital of Malang Regency, Indonesia. Along with Singosari and Batu, Kepanjen act as Satellite city for Malang City. Kepanjen is part of Greater Malang Metropolitan Area.

Background 
Government Regulation No. 18 of 2008 concerning Approval of Moving the Capital City of Malang Regency to Kepanjen District marks the beginning of the establishment of Kepanjen as the new regency capital.

Geography 
Kepanjen is located in south center of Malang Regency. Kepanjen is surrounded by three large mountains: Mount Kawi, Mount Semeru and Southern Malang Mountains.

Administrative borders

Climate

Governance 
Kepanjen District is governed by a district mayor.

Administrative divisions
Kepanjen District consist of 14 villages and 4 sub-districts, as shown on the table below:

Economy

Tourism 
There are various tourist attractions in this district, such as Sumber Maron rafting, Milkindo Green Farm, and Kanjuruhan Stadium.

Sports

Association football 
Arema F.C., currently competing in Liga 1.
Persekam Metro F.C., currently competing in Liga 3.
Kanjuruhan Stadium is home to Arema and has been home to Persekam Metro FC.

Transportation
Kepanjen is connected by a commuter line that runs between Lawang-Malang-Kepanjen. Kepanjen is accessible by other major cities in Java through Kepanjen Station and Kepanjen Terminal. There are plans to make Kepanjen accessible by toll road through Malang-Kepanjen Toll Road, allowing Kepanjen to be linked to Malang, Pasuruan Regency and Surabaya.

See also 
Malang Regency
Districts of Indonesia
List of districts of East Java

References

External links 
Official District Website
Malang

East Java
Districts of East Java
Districts of Indonesia